Ofeq, also spelled Offek or Ofek (lit. Horizon) is the designation of a series of Israeli reconnaissance satellites first launched in 1988. Most Ofeq satellites have been carried on top of Shavit 2 launch vehicles from Palmachim Airbase in Israel, on the Mediterranean coast. The low Earth orbit satellites complete one Earth orbit every 90 minutes. The satellite launches made Israel the eighth nation to gain an indigenous launch capability. Both the satellites and the launchers were designed and manufactured by Israel Aerospace Industries (IAI) with Elbit Systems' El-Op division supplying the optical payload.

Description 
While exact technical details and capabilities are classified, it is assumed that the Ofeq satellites have an effective operational lifespan of 1–3 years and ultraviolet and visible imaging sensors (except Ofeq-8 and -10 which utilize synthetic-aperture radar (SAR) for all-weather and nighttime reconnaissance). Some reports place the imaging resolution at 80 cm for Ofeq-5. Most satellites are launched eastward to gain a boost from the Earth's rotational speed. However, Ofeq satellites are launched westward (in retrograde orbits) over the Mediterranean to avoid flying over, and dropping spent rocket stages over, populated land areas. Other Israeli satellites (such as the AMOS series) are launched from locations in other countries.

Orbital characteristics  
Ofeq's east-to-west orbit of 143.0° orbital inclination is phased to give good daylight coverage of the Middle East. Some American and Russian observation satellites have near-polar orbits and also make between 14 and 16 orbits per day, but pass over Israel on fewer orbits. Spacecraft need to reach roughly 27,000 km/h to achieve low Earth orbit. At 31.88°N, the latitude of Palmachim Airbase, where the angular velocity of the Earth is around 1420 km/h to the east, westward launched Ofeq satellites must use more fuel to counter starting going 1420 km/h the opposite direction. Many other observation satellites with prograde orbits have the same maximum latitude and cover the same areas of the Earth. However the retrograde orbit of Ofeq increases the relative speed to the surface of the Earth and thusly increases the average number of times they pass over Israel on each revolution.

Ofeq satellites make a half-dozen or so daylight passes per day over Israel and the surrounding countries, whereas non-Israeli observation satellites in sun-synchronous orbits get one or two passes per day from their lower inclination orbits.

Since its launch in 2002, Ofeq-5's orbital inclination of 143.4 has been the most-inclined orbit of all of Earth's artificial satellites.

Launch history 
 Ofeq-1, was launched on 19 September 1988, possessed a weight of 155 kg and circled the Earth on an orbit with a perigee of 249 km and an apogee of 1149 km on a course bent around 142.9°. It accomplished mainly solar cells and radio transmission tests.

 Ofeq-2, was launched on 23 April 1990, on a course with a perigee of 149 km and an apogee of 251 km, bent around 143.2°. It also accomplished communication tests.

 Ofeq-3, the launch of Ofeq-3 was initially postponed from 15 September 1994 to 5 April 1995, was launched on 5 April 1995, was the first operational Israeli satellite with reconnaissance (photography) capabilities. It weighed 225 kg and had a perigee of 369 km and was launched on a new version of Shavit 2.

 Ofeq-4, was launched on 22 January 1998, did not achieve Earth orbit due to a launcher failure and was lost.

 Ofeq-5, was launched on 28 May 2002. The 300 kg Ofeq-5 orbited the Earth on a course with a perigee of 262 km and an apogee of 774 km, bent around 143.5°. During the course of its mission, its perigee was raised to 369 km and its apogee was lowered to 771 kilometers, in an attempt to prolong the satellite's lifespan. Some observers believe that the 300 kg weight of the satellite, combined with the additional propulsive requirements of the retrograde orbit, constitute a de facto demonstration of the Shavit's Intercontinental ballistic missile (ICBM) potential.

 Ofeq-6, was launched on 6 September 2004, encountered another launcher failure, failed to achieve low Earth orbit and crashed to the sea. The launcher failure was due to the third stage of the Shavit 2 launcher.

 Ofeq-7 was successfully launched on 11 June 2007 using the Shavit 2 launcher.

 TecSAR (Ofeq-8) designation is used for the synthetic-aperture radar satellite launched by an Indian launch vehicle on 21 January 2008.

 Ofeq-9 was successfully launched on 22 June 2010 from Palmachim Air Base using the upgraded Shavit 2 launcher.

 Ofeq-10, providing high-resolution synthetic-aperture radar, was successfully launched on 9 April 2014 from Palmachim Airbase using the upgraded Shavit 2 launcher.

 Ofeq-11 was successfully launched on 13 September 2016 from Palmachim Airbase using the upgraded Shavit 2 launcher.

 Ofeq-16 was successfully launched on 6 July 2020 from Palmachim Airbase using the upgraded Shavit 2 launcher.

Israel is not known to have attempted any satellite launches between Ofeq-11 and -16. It is not clear whether the Ofeq-12 through -15 designations have been skipped, or applied to other spacecraft.

References

External links 
 IAI's space systems website
 Description of Ofeq-1, -2 in Astronautix
 Description of Ofeq-5 in Astronautix
 Palmachim Air Force base in GlobalSecurity
 Speculation on Ofeq's orbit in GlobalSecurity
 Ofeq-5 description
 Ofeq-7 description

Reconnaissance satellites of Israel
Earth observation satellites of Israel
IAI satellites
First artificial satellites of a country
Military equipment introduced in the 1980s